Ding Sheng may refer to:

 Ding Sheng (general) (1913–1999), Chinese general and Governor of Guangdong
 Ding Sheng (director) (born 1970), Chinese director